The pale-breasted illadopsis (Illadopsis rufipennis) is a species of bird in the family Pellorneidae. It is found throughout the  African tropical rainforest (including Bioko). The Tanzanian illadopsis was formerly considered a subspecies. Its natural habitats are subtropical or tropical moist lowland forest and subtropical or tropical moist montane forest.

References

pale-breasted illadopsis
Birds of the Gulf of Guinea
Birds of the African tropical rainforest
pale-breasted illadopsis
Taxonomy articles created by Polbot